Legett is a town in Edgecombe County, North Carolina,  United States. It is part of the Rocky Mount, North Carolina Metropolitan Statistical Area. The population was 37 in the 2020 Census.

History
Cedar Lane, Mount Prospect, and William and Susan Savage House are listed on the National Register of Historic Places.

Geography
Leggett is located at  (35.992112, -77.579922).

Demographics

As of the census of 2000, there were 77 people, 29 households, and 22 families residing in the town. The population density was 110.8 people per square mile (42.5/km2). There were 33 housing units at an average density of 47.5 per square mile (18.2/km2). The racial makeup of the town was 66.23% White, 32.47% African American and 1.30% Native American. Hispanic or Latino of any race were 2.60% of the population.

There were 29 households, out of which 10.3% had children under the age of 18 living with them, 58.6% were married couples living together, 17.2% had a female householder with no husband present, and 20.7% were non-families. 17.2% of all households were made up of individuals, and 10.3% had someone living alone who was 65 years of age or older. The average household size was 2.66 and the average family size was 3.04.

In the town, the population was spread out, with 18.2% under the age of 18, 3.9% from 18 to 24, 24.7% from 25 to 44, 28.6% from 45 to 64, and 24.7% who were 65 years of age or older. The median age was 47 years. For every 100 females, there were 83.3 males. For every 100 females age 18 and over, there were 85.3 males.

The median income for a household in the town was $43,125, and the median income for a family was $46,250. Males had a median income of $16,250 versus $34,063 for females. The per capita income for the town was $17,112. There were 6.7% of families and 18.6% of the population living below the poverty line, including no under eighteens and 12.5% of those over 64.

Notable Events
On September 7, 2018, Leggett mayor Gary Skelton and his wife were found dead in their home as a result of multiple gunshot wounds. Edgecombe County Sheriff Cleveland Atkinson announced Friday that Keith Earl Williams, 25, who lived in the area and has a criminal history, was arrested and charged with first-degree murder. A second man, who was not identified, was also arrested. Williams had been released from prison a week prior to the homicides and was on parole."

References

Towns in Edgecombe County, North Carolina
Towns in North Carolina
Rocky Mount metropolitan area